O2 World may refer to:

 O2 World Berlin, currently known as Mercedes-Benz Arena
 O2 World Hamburg, currently known as Barclaycard Arena